Rast Panjgah (or Rast) is the name of a dastgah (musical mode) in Iranian music and of a maqam in Arabic and related systems of music.

Rast is a Persian word meaning "right" or "direct". Rast is regarded as the basic dastgah in Iranian music and later on was adopted in Arabic and Turkish makam music, in the same way as the major scale in Western music, though it is rather different from the major scale in detail. Rast features a half-flat third and a half-flat seventh scale degrees.

Middle eastern Sephardic Jews liken the word rast to "head" from the Hebrew word  rosh. Therefore, they have a tradition of applying maqam rast to the prayers whenever they begin a new Torah book in the weekly Torah portions (this occurs approximately five times a year as there are five books in the Torah).

Maqam Rast on Do:  Do  /  Re  /  Mi (half-Flat)  /  Fa  /  Sol  /  La  /  Si (H-F)  /  Do.

Maqam Rast RE:   Re  /  Mi  /  Fa# (half-Sharp)  /  Sol  /  La  /  Si  /  Do# (H-S)  /  Re.

Maqam Rast Mi:   Mi  /  Fa# /  Sol# (H-S)  /  La  /  Si  /  Do#  /  Re# (H-S)  /  Mi.

Maqam Rast Fa:   Fa  /  Sol  /  La (H-F)  /  Si flat /  Do  /  Re  /  Mi (H-F)  /  Fa.

Maqam Rast Sol:  Sol  /  La  /  Si (H-F)  /  Do  /  Re  /  Mi  /  Fa# (H-S)  /  Sol.

Maqam Rast La:   La  /  Si  /  Do# (H-S)  /  Re  /  Mi  /  Fa#   /  Sol# (H-S)  /  La.

Maqam Rast Si:   si  /  Do#  /  Re# (H-S)  /  Mi  /  Fa#  /  Sol#  /  La# (H-S)  /  Si.

(H-F) is Half-Flat: keep in mind that flat lowers the note half step down, 
Half flat means the note is lowered 1/4 step down)

(H-S) is Half-Sharp: Sharp raises the note half step up, half sharp raises it 1/4 step up)

See also
List of makams

References

External links
Rast page from Maqam World

Modes (music)
Musical scales
Arabic music theory